Miltona may refer to:

 Miltona, Minnesota
 Lake Miltona, a lake in Minnesota
 Miltona Township, Douglas County, Minnesota